The Satanic Scriptures is a book by the current High Priest of the Church of Satan, Peter H. Gilmore, published April 30, 2007, by Scapegoat Publishing. The book is a collection of essays and rituals, and features a prelude by Blanche Barton and dedication by Peggy Nadramia. The book has been translated into Spanish, French, German, Russian, Portuguese and Estonian.
 
On Walpurgisnacht of 2017, Underworld Amusements released a new tenth anniversary edition, and has taken over publishing the book from Scapegoat. The new edition features the speech Gilmore gave to the Church of Satan's private 50th Anniversary event.

References

External links
 
 Las Escrituras Satánicas
 Underworld Amusements
 Church of Satan

2007 non-fiction books
Satanic texts
Essay collections